Marching On may refer to:

Marching On, a 1927 novel by James Boyd
Marching On!, a 1943 American race film directed and written by Spencer Williams
"Marchin On", a 2010 song by One Republic
"Marching On" (Dami Im song), 2020
"Marching On", single by The Alarm, MacDonald & Peters from Declaration, 1982
"Marching On", a 1979 song by BZN
"Marching On", a 1964 song by The Maytals